The Colorado Book Awards are awards presented annually to Colorado authors, editors, illustrators, and photographers who exemplify the best in their category in the state during a given year.  Awards have been presented since 1991.  The awards are given by the Colorado Center for the Book, itself a program of Colorado Humanities.  Awards are selected by a group of judges who are themselves selected on the basis of interest and competence.  The common criteria for each category are content, originality, and widespread appeal; each category also has additional criteria appropriate to that category.

Categories 

 Fiction
 Non-fiction
 Poetry
 Mystery
 Science fiction
 Colorado & the West
 Biography/Memoir
 Advice
 Collections/Anthology
 Children
 Young Adult

External links
Official website

American literary awards
Colorado culture
Awards established in 1991
1991 establishments in Colorado
Centers for the Book